Agʿazi is the name of a region of the Aksumite Empire in what consists today of Eastern Tigray and Southern Eritrea.

History 
The earliest attestation of this name can be found in the determined nisba-form yg'ḏyn in three pre-Aksumite Royal inscriptions: [rb]h/mlkn/sr'n/yg'ḏyn/mkrb/d'mt/web' 'RBH, the victorious king, he of (the tribe?) YG'Ḏ, mukarrib of D'MT and SB' (RIE 8:1-2); lmn/mlkn/sr'n/yg/ḏyn/mkrb/d'mt/wsb'/bn/rbb 'LMN, the victorious king he of (the tribe?) YG'Ḏ, mukarrib of D'MT and SB', son of RBH' (RIE 5 A:1-2, the same formula in RIE 10:1-5). YG'Ḏ seems to be the name of the leading tribe or royal family settled in the region of Akele Guzai.

In Aksumite inscriptions this name never appears. In the Greek Monumentum Adulitanum (RIE 277), the author (an Aksumite king of the 2nd-3rd century AD) states: Γάζη έθνος έπολέμηα ("I fought the Gaze-people"). This people's name has been connected with the term Ge'ez. The Sinaiticus and Laurentianus manuscripts (both 11th century) explain in margin: "Gaze means the Aksumites. Until now they are called Agaze". The reconstruction [ag]āzә[yān] in RIE 264 from Zafār (Yemen) (late 5th-early 6th century AD) has been proposed by Müller, but the fragment is too badly damaged to provide any help as to who could be meant by this name.

The only certain attestation is found in Abraha's Sabaean dam-inscription CIH 541 from Mārib (dated 543/548 AD), where he calls himself mlkn gzyn. The meaning of this title remains enigmatic, especially since Abraha is at this time not any longer the Aksumite viceroy, but the autonomous king.

A connection between agāzī and the people Agēzāt, mentioned in two of Ezana's inscriptions seems questionable.

References 

Regions of Ethiopia
Tigray Region
Regions of Eritrea
Aksumite Empire
Aksumite cities